Adolf Frederick, or Adolph Frederick (14 May 171012 February 1771) was King of Sweden from 1751 until his death. He was the son of Christian August of Holstein-Gottorp, Prince of Eutin, and Albertina Frederica of Baden-Durlach. He was an uncle of Catherine the Great.

The first king from the House of Holstein-Gottorp, Adolf Frederick was a weak monarch, installed as first in line to the throne following the parliamentary government's failure to reconquer the Baltic provinces in 1741–1743. Aside from a few attempts, supported by pro-absolutist factions among the nobility, to reclaim the absolute monarchy held by previous monarchs, he remained a mere constitutional figurehead until his death.

His reign saw an extended period of internal peace. However, the finances stagnated following failed mercantilist doctrines pursued by the Hat administration. The Hat administration ended during the 1765–1766 parliament, where the Cap opposition took over the government and enacted reforms towards greater economic liberalism, as well as a Freedom of Press Act. The Freedom of Press Act is unique for the time for its curtailing of all censorship, retaining punitive measures only for libeling the monarch or the Church of Sweden.

Ancestry
Adolf Frederick's father was Christian Augustus (1673–1726) duke and a younger prince of Schleswig-Holstein-Gottorp, prince-bishop of Lübeck, and administrator, during the Great Northern War, of the duchies of Holstein-Gottorp for his relative Charles Frederick.

His mother, Albertina Frederica of Baden-Durlach (1682–1755), was a descendant of earlier royal dynasties of Sweden, great-granddaughter of Princess Catherine of Sweden, mother of King Charles X of Sweden. On his mother's side, Adolf Frederick was descended from King Gustav Vasa and Christina Magdalena, a sister of Charles X of Sweden.

Reign

From 1727 to 1750 Prince Adolf Frederick was the prince-bishop of Lübeck. This meant he ruled a fief around and including Eutin. After his first cousin, Charles Frederick, Duke of Holstein-Gottorp, died in 1739, Adolf Frederick became the administrator of Holstein-Kiel during the minority of the duke's orphan son, Charles Peter Ulrich. Shortly afterward, the young boy was invited to Russia by his maternal aunt, Empress Elizabeth, who soon declared him her heir. He later became known as Peter III of Russia.

In 1743, Adolf Frederick was elected heir to the throne of Sweden by the Hat faction (Swedish: Hattarna). The Hat faction wanted to obtain better conditions at the Treaty of Åbo from Empress Elizabeth of Russia, who had adopted his nephew as her heir. He succeeded as King Adolf Frederick 8 years later on 25 March 1751.

During his 20-year reign, Adolf Frederick was little more than a figurehead, the real power being with the Riksdag of the Estates, often distracted by party strife. Twice he endeavored to free himself from the tutelage of the estates. The first occasion was in 1756. Stimulated by his consort Louisa Ulrika of Prussia (sister of Frederick the Great), he tried to regain a portion of the attenuated prerogative through the Coup of 1756 to abolish the rule of the Riksdag of the Estates and reinstate absolute monarchy in Sweden. He nearly lost his throne in consequence. On the second occasion during the December Crisis of 1768, under the guidance of his eldest son, Gustav, he succeeded in overthrowing the "Cap" (Swedish: Mössorna) senate, but was unable to make any use of his victory.

Death
Adolf Frederick died suddenly in Stockholm on 12 February 1771 with symptoms resembling either heart failure or poisoning. Popular stories about his death having resulted from a large meal (consisting of lobster, caviar, sauerkraut, kippers, and champagne as well as 14 helpings of his favourite dessert  of semla pastries and hot milk) are considered propagandist by modern writers.

Following his death, his son Gustav III seized power in 1772 in a military coup d'état, reinstating absolute rule.

Legacy
The King was regarded as dependent on others, a weak ruler, and lacking of any talents. However, he was allegedly a good husband, a caring father, and a gentle master to his servants. His favourite pastime was to make snuffboxes, which he allegedly spent a great deal of time doing. His hospitality and friendliness were witnessed by many who deeply mourned him at his death.

Children
By his marriage to Princess Louisa Ulrika of Prussia (which took place on 18 August/29 August 1744 in Drottningholm), he had the following children:

 (Stillborn) (18 February 1745 in Stockholm)
 Gustav III (1746–1792)
 Charles XIII (1748–1818)
 Frederick Adolf (1750–1803)
 Sofia Albertina (1753–1829)

With Jeanne Du Londel he had one son:

 Adolf Fredriksson (c. 1734-1771), Captain in the Swedish Army.

With Marguerite Morel he had one son who died as a child: 
 Frederici (c. 1761 - 1771)

Adolf Frederick may have been the father of Lolotte Forssberg by Ulla von Liewen, but this has however never been confirmed.

Ancestors

References

External links 
 

1710 births
1771 deaths
18th-century Swedish monarchs
People from Schleswig, Schleswig-Holstein
Rulers of Finland
House of Holstein-Gottorp
Swedish monarchs of German descent
People from the Duchy of Schleswig
Burials at Riddarholmen Church
Lutheran Prince-Bishops of Lübeck
Age of Liberty people